Dương Minh Châu is a rural district of Tây Ninh province in the Southeast region of Vietnam. As of 2003 the district had a population of 99,230. The district covers an area of 407 km². The district capital lies at Dương Minh Châu. It is the third largest district in the province after Tân Biên and Tân Châu districts. The majority of the population are ethnic Vietnamese.

Geography 
The district is bordered to the west by Tây Ninh City, to the north by Tân Châu, to the south by Gò Dầu and to the east by the provinces of Bình Dương and Bình Phước.

Tourism 
A tourist attraction in the area is the Dầu Tiếng Lake, an artificial body of water. It is the largest freshwater lake in the country and was built in the 1980s. It lies on the border of the district with Tân Châu, Bình Phước and Bình Dương, with most of the area being in Dương Minh Châu.

Divisions 
Apart from the district seat of the same name, the district comprises the following communes.
Bàu Năng
Phước Minh
Phước Ninh
Chà Là
Truông Mít
Cầu Khởi
Phan
Suối Đá
Lộc Ninh
Bến Củi

References

Districts of Tây Ninh province